Wila Quta (Aymara wila blood, blood-red, quta lake, "red lake", Hispanicized spelling Wila Kkota) is a mountain in the Andes in Bolivia reaching up to  above sea level. It is located in the Oruro Department, Challapata Province, in the south-east of the Challapata Municipality. Wila Quta is situated south of the Jach'a River and north of Nacional Route 1. It lies next to the mountain Wila Qullu, northwest of it, which reaches the same height.

References 

Mountains of Oruro Department